Sunday's Silence is  the third novel from Gina B. Nahai and follows the story of a journalist searching for the truth about his father's death. The book was published in 2003 by Washington Square Press in the United States and became a Los Angeles Times bestseller.

Plot summary
Adam Watkins is the illegitimate son of little Sam Jenkins, founder of the snake-handling Holiness sect in Appalachia. After growing up in a dysfunctional Holy Roller family, Adam has been running from his past for twenty years, until he returns to investigate the possible murder of his father by one of the church members. The suspect is a woman named Blue, who has a hazy past and a reputation for being immune to earthly harm.

Reception 

Critical response to the book was mostly positive. Publishers Weekly wrote that "Nahai explores the enigma of charisma, opening a window on an insular world and rendering the "other" America explicable.

References

2003 American novels
American mystery novels
Novels set in Appalachia
Jewish American novels
Novels by Gina B. Nahai
Washington Square Press books